Stevens Institute of Technology is a private research university in Hoboken, New Jersey. Founded in 1870, it is one of the oldest technological universities in the United States and was the first college in America solely dedicated to mechanical engineering. The 55-acre campus encompasses Castle Point, the highest point in Hoboken, a campus green and 43 academic, student and administrative buildings.

Established through an 1868 bequest from Edwin Augustus Stevens, enrollment at Stevens includes more than 8,000 undergraduate and graduate students representing 47 states and 60 countries throughout Asia, Europe and Latin America. Stevens comprises three schools and one college that deliver technology-based STEM (science, technology, engineering and mathematics) degrees and degrees in business, arts, humanities and social sciences: The Charles V. Schaefer, Jr., School of Engineering and Science, School of Business, School of Systems and Enterprises, and College of Arts and Letters. For undergraduates, Stevens offers the Bachelor of Engineering (B.E.), Bachelor of Science (B.S.) and Bachelor of Arts (B.A.). At the graduate level, Stevens offers programs in engineering, science, systems, engineering, management and the liberal arts. Graduate students can pursue advanced degrees in more than 50 different designations ranging from graduate certificates and master's degrees to Ph.D. levels. 

Stevens is classified among "R2: Doctoral Universities – High research activity." The university is home to two national Centers of Excellence as designated by the U.S. Department of Defense and U.S. Department of Homeland Security. Two members of the Stevens community, as alumni or faculty, have been awarded the Nobel Prize: Frederick Reines (class of 1939), in physics, and Irving Langmuir (Chemistry faculty 1906–1909), in chemistry.

History

Establishment and the Stevens family

Stevens Institute of Technology is named for "America's First Family of inventors" — the Stevens family. The Stevenses influenced American engineering for decades, designing steamboats, locomotives, railroad tracks and a host of other technical innovations that powered the early United States.  

In 1784, the land now occupied by Stevens Institute of Technology was purchased by John Stevens, who would later reverse-engineer the British steam locomotive to American standards for domestic manufacture. This innovation would be employed by ferries to Manhattan. Later generations of ferries still run from Hoboken's piers. Robert Stevens, one of John's sons, invented the flanged T rail, a form of railroad rail in prevalent use today, including from the Lackawanna Terminal of Hoboken whose docks are also in a style Robert designed. Along with his brother Edwin A. Stevens, Robert created America's first commercial railroad presently operating as a large portion of Amtrak’s Northeast Corridor.

John Cox Stevens, John Stevens' eldest son, was the first commodore of the New York Yacht Club. He and his brother Edwin built the yacht America and were aboard its 1851 regatta victory in England, later recognized as the first winner of the America's Cup; the competition bears the name of the Stevenses' yacht. The New York Yacht Club would defend its title until the 1983 race.

Edwin died in 1868. In his will, he left a bequest for the establishment of an "institution of learning," providing his trustees with land and funds. Edwin's will was executed by surviving wife, Martha Bayard Stevens, who would also serve as a lifetime Trustee of the institute that now bears the family's name. Martha Stevens oversaw much of the family's philanthropy toward the City of Hoboken, including founding of the Church of the Holy Innocents as a free Episcopal church; a foundling hospital and birthing center at St Mary's Hospital; the Robert L. Stevens Fund for Municipal Research; manual training schools for both boys and young girls in Hoboken; the Hoboken Public Library and Manual Training School.

Early years
Stevens Institute of Technology opened in 1870, offering a rigorous engineering curriculum grounded in scientific principles and the humanities. The original course of study was a single, rigorous curriculum based upon the European Polytechnic model of engineering science (following the French and German scientific and polytechnic schools), rather than the shop schools that were common at that time. The original degree offered was the mechanical engineer (M.E.), in addition to a Ph.D. in mechanical engineering, chemistry and physics. Stevens granted several doctoral degrees between 1870 and 1900, making it one of the earliest Ph.D.-granting institutions in the United States. The broad-based interdisciplinary philosophy was put into practice by the founders from the first graduating class. Despite the title of the degree and concentration in mechanical engineering, the curriculum included courses in all engineering disciplines of the time: mechanical, civil, chemical and electrical. In 1880, Robert H. Thurston, professor of mechanical engineering, was nominated the first president of the American Society of Mechanical Engineers.

The campus was situated at the periphery of the family estate at Castle Point in Hoboken. It occupied a single building now designated Edwin A. Stevens Hall, which was added to the National Register of Historic Places in 1994. Stone designs on the building's facade are believed to be derived from a pattern repeated in the floor mosaic of Hagia Sophia, the great cathedral in Istanbul, which Edwin Stevens is believed to have visited in the late 19th century.

1900-1999
In its first century, Stevens grew quickly, evolving from a small, four-year undergraduate engineering college into a comprehensive technological university with strengths in key fields such as quantum computing, artificial intelligence, resilience engineering, robotics, complex systems, healthcare, biomedical research, brain research and fintech. The university produced a Nobel Prize winner (Frederick Reines '39 M.S. '41) and thousands of new technologies, products, services and research insights. 

In 1906, students, under the guidance of President A.C. Humphreys, created the honor system – a moral and ethical code governing the life of Stevens students and preaching equality and honest work. The student-run system still exists to this day, in which the accused are tried by their peers with a punishment recommended to the faculty. Stevens was the first technical school to implement such a system.

During World War II, Stevens Institute of Applied Science was one of 131 colleges and universities nationally that took part in the V-12 Navy College Training Program which offered students a path to a Navy commission. During this time, the institute was also honored by the naming of the Victory Ship, SS Stevens Victory, a merchant cargo ship built by the Bethlehem Fairfield Shipyard at Baltimore. Launched on May 29, 1945, the ship was one of 150 named for U.S. colleges and universities.

In 1959, the undergraduate engineering degree was changed to the bachelor of engineering (B.E.) to reflect the broad-based interdisciplinary engineering curriculum (the M.E. degree of that time was a baccalaureate degree, not to be confused with the present Engineer's degree, which is a terminal professional graduate degree).

Also in 1959, the land occupied by the 40-room Victorian mansion, "Castle Stevens" or "Villa on the Hudson", was repurposed for the 14-story administration building completed in 1962, later renamed the Wesley J. Howe Building. During its tenure as a campus building starting in 1911, it served as a dormitory, cafeteria and office space. The unsupported cantilevered staircase, with its elegant hand-carved balustrade, was one of only two such "floating staircases" in America.

The SS Stevens, a 473-foot, 14,893-ton ship, served as a floating dormitory from 1968 to 1975 for approximately 150 students. Moored on the Hudson River at the foot of campus across from New York City, this first collegiate floating dormitory became one of the best-known college landmarks in the country. Following the sale of the ship, students of the Class of 1975 presented funds to the institute for the preparation of a site on Wittpenn Walk where one of Stevens' six-ton anchors was placed in tribute to "the Ship." On the day Stevens was towed away, the alumni association recounted sentiments in its journal, "She disappeared into the fog and into our hearts."

Stevens' graduate program admitted women for the first time in 1967. Stevens' undergraduate program began admitting women in 1971. The Class of 1975 matriculated 19 women, and 50 years later, women make up more than 30 percent of undergraduates. The change in demographics eventually led to the establishment of the Lore-El Center for Women's Leadership, named for Lore E. Feiler, to promote the empowerment of women at Stevens.

In 1982, Stevens became the first institution in the U.S. to require all incoming first-year undergraduate students to purchase and use a personal computer. Around this time, an intranet was installed throughout campus, which placed Stevens among the first universities with a campus network.

WCPR: Castle Point Radio, the radio station of Stevens Institute of Technology since 1961, has over 10,000 LPs, one of the largest record collections in New Jersey.

2000 and beyond 
Stevens has continued to grow since the turn of the millennium, expanding its enrollment, facilities, partnerships and research programs. The university's collaborations with industry and government include numerous grant awards, contracts and collaborative projects, as well as two National Centers of Excellence designated by the U.S. Department of Homeland Security and Department of Defense. 

Since 2010, undergraduate enrollment has increased 67 percent and full-time graduate enrollment has increased 73 percent. Stevens has adapted and expanded to accommodate that growth, with a focus on modernizing campus facilities and infrastructure. Under the 2012-22 university strategic plan, Stevens made AV and IT upgrades to 100 percent of its classrooms. Improvements also included two new anchor facilities. The Gateway Academic Center, an 89,500-square-foot teaching and research facility, opened in 2019. In 2022, Stevens opened the University Center Complex, providing residential housing for approximately 1,000 students, as well as a campus hub with meeting, collaboration, event spaces, a fitness center and dining facilities. 

Stevens has also focused on increasing access and opportunity for students from underrepresented groups. Among undergraduates, there was a 98 percent increase in women and 149 percent increase in the number of underrepresented minorities between 2011 and 2021. Initiatives developed to provide financial, academic and professional development support for students — including the Accessing Careers in Engineering and Science (ACES), A. James Clark Scholars and Lawrence T. Babbio Pinnacle Scholars programs — have played a role in this growth. 

In recognition of the progress Stevens made through its strategic plan, the American Council on Education presented the university with its 2018 ACE/Fidelity Investments Award for Institutional Transformation. The award is given to "institutions that have responded to higher education challenges in innovative and creative ways and achieved dramatic changes in a relatively brief period." 

Stevens was named one of the healthiest campuses in the nation by Active Minds, a national nonprofit dedicated to student wellness. It has also been recognized for its commitments to environmental sustainability, including receiving the Association for the Advancement of Sustainability in Higher Education (AASHE) STARS Gold Rating in 2020. In 2021, Stevens announced it would source 100 percent of its electricity from renewable energy starting in that year's fall semester. 

In April 2021, Stevens became one of the first higher education institutions in the United States to require COVID-19 vaccination not only for students, but also faculty and staff. In December 2021, the university announced it would require all students, faculty and staff to receive the COVID-19 booster vaccine to be compliant with the rule.

S.C. Williams Library Archives
Stevens’ S.C. Williams Library houses the university's Special Collections, which contain the largest compendium of items relating to Frederick Winslow Taylor, Class of 1883; one of the finest accumulations in the Western Hemisphere of prints, manuscripts in facsimile and books by and about Leonardo da Vinci; and artwork by Alexander Calder. The Taylor collection consists largely of his personal and work-related correspondence regarding implementation of scientific management, a field in which he was a pioneer, as well as portraits, photographs, furniture and ephemera belonging to the Taylor family. The other collection hallmark, the "Leonardo da Vinci Room," was donated by John W. Lieb, Class of 1880.

The library's archives also house many Stevens family documents and artifacts from early American and New Jersey history dating to the American Revolutionary War. The Archives and Special Collections department aims to engage the student, faculty, staff, alumni, and local and global communities with these primary sources and artifacts. The Hoboken Historical Museum hosted a six-month exhibition on the Stevens Family and their contributions to American life and featured many of the library's contents. In early 2015, the Stevens Class of 1960 produced a documentary titled "Stevens and Sons: America's First Family of Engineers" narrated by Richard Reeves '60 that highlighted the family's contributions.

Attorney General Matter
In 2009, after a two-year investigation by the New Jersey attorney general, Stevens and the attorney general filed competing lawsuits against one another. The attorney general suit against Stevens, its then-president, Harold J. Raveché, and chairman of the board of trustees, Lawrence Babbio Jr., alleged numerous claims involving breach of fiduciary duty and other causes of action primarily relating to financial practices and the financial management of the institute and the compensation and certain loan transactions involving the then-president. The Stevens suit against the attorney general contended that she had overstepped her legal authority over a private institution and sought that any case be pursued by confidential arbitration.

On January 15, 2010, Stevens announced that the institute and the attorney general's office settled the competing lawsuits. In the settlement, the parties agreed to a number of changes to Stevens' governance procedures. It appointed a special counsel to oversee the implementation of these changes and prepare periodic reports on Stevens’ progress. Additionally, in a letter to the institute on January 15, 2010, Babbio and Raveché announced that Raveché had voluntarily decided to step down on or before June 30, 2010, after 22 years in that position. The settlement made Raveché a consultant to the institute through October 2011 and forced him to repay the outstanding balance of loans previously made to him by Stevens. It concluded with no admission of liability or unlawful conduct by any party.

The special counsel prepared six reports on the progress of the governance changes outlined in the settlement agreement. The sixth and final quarterly report, dated August 3, 2011, stated that Stevens completed on schedule the agreed-upon changes to its governance procedures and that "Special Counsel now finds Stevens to be in full compliance with the terms of the Consent Judgment." While the specific compliance requirements were fulfilled, the special counsel continued to monitor certain activities of Stevens through February 2012.

On June 6, 2016, the consent judgment that had been in place since January 2010 between Stevens Institute of Technology and the New Jersey attorney general was lifted by court order and with the consent of the attorney general's office. The consent judgment arose from circumstances at Stevens pre-2010 and addressed a number of matters relating primarily to governance.

As stated in the consent judgment, "Stevens has fully complied with the obligations to which it agreed in the consent judgment and has demonstrated to the State a continued focus on maintaining best practices in the area of governance for institutions of higher education. Lifting the consent judgment will afford Stevens added flexibility to make further enhancements to the ways it oversees its affairs and to respond and adapt to the evolving landscape of best governance practices."

Academics

Colleges
Stevens is composed of four academic schools: the Charles V. Schaefer Jr. School of Engineering and Science, the School of Systems and Enterprises, the School of Business and the College of Arts and Letters. Stevens offers 35 undergraduate majors and has a 12:1 student-to-faculty ratio. Graduate offerings include 20 (plus three interdisciplinary) Ph.D. programs, 58 master's programs, 194 certificate programs and graduate-level offerings custom designed for corporations.

Stevens offers the Bachelor of Engineering (B.E.) degree and Bachelor of Science (B.S.) degree. At the graduate level, Stevens offers the Master of Engineering (M.Eng.), Master of Technology Management (M.T.M.), Master of Science (M.S.), Master of Business Administration (M.B.A.), Engineer (E.E., M.E., Comp. E., C.E. and Ch. E.), and Doctor of Philosophy (Ph.D.) degrees.

The Schaefer School's mission is to address the challenges facing engineering and science now and into the future while remaining true to the vision of the founders of Stevens as one of the first dedicated engineering schools in the nation. The Schaefer School offers bachelor's, master's and doctoral degrees with a variety of certificates in various engineering and scientific disciplines for full-time students and part-time professionals. The goal of most doctoral work is to develop technologies and processes that provide social benefits in security, energy, environmental preservation and protection, medicine, and health care. Stevens Institute of Technology had a dual degree program in engineering with New York University until New York University started its own engineering school in 2008 by acquiring another reputed school of engineering, which is located in New York City.

The School of Business offers certificates and undergraduate, master's, M.B.A. and doctoral degrees in a variety of technology management specialties. The Stevens undergraduate program emphasizes mathematical business models, applications of hard science to the concept and marketing of products, financial engineering (stochastic calculus, probability and statistics as descriptors of the dynamic behavior of financial markets) and the case-study method of business analysis. The capstone project in the business curriculum is the design of a technology-based business, including an accompanying business plan, operations research, market analysis, financial prospectus, and risk analysis. Several projects have been developed into real companies.

The School of Systems and Enterprises (SSE) features faculty with industry and government experience to provide real-world applications to its students. SSE offers bachelor's, master's and doctoral degrees, along with a combined bachelor's and master's program and graduate certificates. SSE offers flexibility in its graduate course delivery. Options include on campus in Hoboken or online through StevensOnline. The school's education and research reaches across industries, including defense, homeland security, intelligence, nuclear weapons, communications, space, infrastructure, finance and business solutions. The school follows an open academic model, which emphasizes the interplay between academia, industry and government.

The College of Arts and Letters (CAL) approaches the humanities, social sciences and the arts from a science and technology perspective. While every undergraduate at Stevens is required to take a set of humanities courses, CAL offers B.A. degrees in literature, history, philosophy and the social sciences. CAL was established as a separate college in 2007 as part of a larger institutional realignment. CAL's formation followed a history of integrating humanities and liberal arts education, which dates back to the university's founding in 1870. In fall 2011, CAL began offering a new M.A. and graduate certificate in Technology, Policy and Ethics. CAL also offers an accelerated, six-year combined bachelor's/J.D. degree program in partnership with New York Law School and Seton Hall University School of Law.

Cooperative education and career placement
Undergraduate students may elect to follow the cooperative education program, usually extending their timeline from four to five years, to gain about 18 months of increasingly progressive work experience. The program helps students confirm their choice of major, and clarify their interests and career goals while working in full-time, paid positions. Approximately 30% of undergraduate students follow this path while the remaining engage in research, externships or internships.

The combination of rigorous coursework and real-world application allows 73% of students to finalize their path prior to graduation, with 97% securing their intended outcomes within six months after graduation. The average accepted salary across all majors for the Class of 2021 was $75,400, with a maximum of $90,600, from over 300 companies recruiting on campus. Majors among those ranking the highest were computer science, computer engineering and software engineering. The value of a Stevens degree is often quantified through return on investment, in which the university ranks among the top in the United States.

Research

The research enterprise at Stevens features three national Centers of Excellence designated by the U.S. government: the National Center for Secure and Resilient (CSR) Maritime Commerce and the National Systems Engineering Research Center (SERC).

Stevens also features the Center for the Advancement of Secure Systems and Information Assurance (CASSIA), dedicated to advancements in cybersecurity. The center was developed in response to Stevens' designations by the Department of Homeland Security and the National Security Agency as a National Center of Academic Excellence in Information Assurance Education for the academic years 2003 through 2014, and as a National Center of Academic Excellence in Information Assurance Research for the years 2008 through 2013.

The Center for Maritime Systems at Stevens works to preserve and secure America's maritime resources and assets. The center includes the Davidson Laboratory, a research facility focused on physical modeling and computer simulation of marine craft designs. The lab houses a 313-foot-long wave tank capable of recreating a variety of wave types for maritime testing. Work at the lab was dedicated to the war effort during World War II. The facility is one of only two designated International Historic Mechanical Engineering Landmarks in the United States.

The Center for Maritime Systems contributed to the US Airways Flight 1549 Miracle on the Hudson recovery in 2009 by analyzing water currents to identify the best location to tow the plane and locate the plane's missing engine.

The Center for Innovation in Engineering and Science Education (CIESE), part of the Schaefer School, provides expertise to improve K–12 science, mathematics, engineering and technology education, with the goal to increase the number of students pursuing STEM majors and careers in technological fields. CIESE received the Presidential Award for Science, Mathematics, and Engineering Mentoring in 2011.

The Center for Environmental Systems (CES) develops environmental technologies through collaboration between faculty in the Department of Civil, Environmental and Ocean Engineering, the Department of Defense, and private enterprise. Principal research areas for CES include drinking water technologies, wastewater treatment, air pollution control, environmental systems modeling and monitoring, pollution prevention and minimization, and life-cycle assessment.

The Highly Filled Materials Institute (HfMI) develops the theoretical, experimental, and numerical analysis techniques for providing solutions for the problems of the industrial processing, especially with twin-screw extrusion, of highly filled materials. HfMI research areas include extrusion, die and extruder design, crystallization, surface science, particle size analysis and rheology.

The Center for Research toward Advancing Financial Technologies (CRAFT), co-led by Stevens and Rensselaer Polytechnic Institute, is the first NSF-backed industry-university cooperative research center devoted specifically to financial technology and science. CRAFT is designed to create a community for industry to engage with university researchers to advance fintech innovation. 

Other research centers at Stevens are the Center for Complex Systems and Enterprises (CCSE), Center for Decision Technologies, Center for Quantum Science and Engineering, Center for Environmental Systems, MicroDevice Lab, Center for Healthcare Innovation, Center for Neuromechanics, Hanlon Financial Systems Center, Maritime Security Center, NJ Center for Microchemical Systems, STAR Center, Stevens Institute for Artificial Intelligence, and Systems Engineering Research Center.  

The U.S. Department of Energy invited Stevens to compete in the 2015 Solar Decathlon held at Orange County Great Park in Irvine, California, among 19 other universities. Stevens’ entry, SURE HOUSE, was inspired by Hurricane Sandy. A net-zero home resilient enough to withstand Hurricane-force winds and flooding, the entry won the competition. SURE HOUSE achieved a total score of 950.685, ranking first in architecture, market appeal, communications, appliances, engineering, commuting and home life. It also received second place in the comfort zone contest.

Stevens also competed as one of 20 teams in the 2013 Solar Decathlon, the first time the competition was held outside of Washington, D.C. Stevens' independent entry, "Ecohabit," placed fourth overall and second among United States entries. 

Through a partnership with Parsons The New School for Design and Milano School of International Affairs, Management and Urban Policy, Stevens designed an affordable green home as part of the 2011 Solar Decathlon. The entry, "Empowerhouse," won first place in affordability during the 2011 competition. The team partnered with Habitat for Humanity of Washington, D.C., to provide the home to a low-income family in the Deanwood section of Washington at the conclusion of the competition.

Entrepreneurship
Stevens embraces a culture of entrepreneurship instilled in the institute from its founding family, who transformed their inventions into a number of successful enterprises like the first steam-driven locomotive. More recently, there have been significant sales of Stevens intellectual property, including PlasmaSol and Hydroglobe. The university's Office of Innovation and Entrepreneurship was established in 2008 to enhance scientific discoveries by facilitating technology transfer. 

ISTEM@Stevens is a four-year entrepreneurship coaching program for incoming first-year students. The program focuses not only on technology and innovation, but also the process required to transform the idea into a fully developed company or nonprofit. The curriculum includes both classes and independent studies. 

Launchpad@Stevens is a one-year program that gives undergraduate students the chance to learn about entrepreneurship and innovation alongside professionals who are building technology-based businesses. Participants learn how to identify ideas with potential commercial viability and work in teams to build those ideas into viable businesses.

Stevens' Innovation Expo, also referred to as "Senior Design Day" or simply "D-Day" by students, is an annual event at the end of the spring semester to feature capstone projects from undergraduate seniors of all schools and majors. Capstone projects take place over two semesters. The day of activities is also marked by the Project Plan Pitch and Elevator Pitch Competition in which students are judged on presentation of their idea and feasibility; many competitors spin-out companies and business ventures from their projects. The panel of judges typically consists of entrepreneurs, CEOs and venture capitalists.

Additionally, the institute hosts the "Thomas H. Scholl Lecture by Visiting Entrepreneurs." Guest lecturers include Dr. Paul R. Sanberg, Jeong H. Kim, Dr. Winslow Sargeant, and Ann Fandozzi. The campus is also home to monthly summits of "NJ Tech Meetup," branded as "NJ's largest technology and entrepreneurial community." It is composed of over 150 entrepreneurs and innovators.

Rankings

Stevens is ranked 14th nationally for Return on Investment for Students by PayScale's 2021 rankings
Stevens is ranked 13th nationally for Best Career Placement (Private Schools) by The Princeton Review in 2021
Stevens is ranked 4th in the U.S. for Best Value Private Colleges by PayScale in 2021

Athletics

The Stevens Ducks are composed of 25 NCAA Division III teams representing Stevens Institute of Technology in intercollegiate competition. The Ducks are members of the Middle Atlantic Conferences (MAC) and the MAC Freedom Conference for all sports except fencing. Men's fencing competes in the Mid-Atlantic Collegiate Fencing Association (MACFA) and women's fencing competes in both the Eastern Women's Fencing Conference (EWFC) and the National Intercollegiate Women's Fencing Association (NIWFA).

Stevens rejoined the MAC in July 2019 after an absence of over 40 years, having most recently been in the Empire 8 conference. The Ducks spent 12 seasons as full members of the Empire 8 after a tenure in the Skyline Conference. Stevens competed as an associate member of the Empire 8 in field hockey during the 2006 season. The Ducks won a total of 62 team championships and 367 individual championships (429 total) during their time in the Empire 8. 

The move to the MAC and the MAC Freedom brought 23 of the department's 25 teams under a single conference umbrella; wrestling had been competing in the Centennial Conference since 2004 and men's volleyball was a founding member of the United Volleyball Conference. Stevens has found success in the MAC, winning 23 team and 105 individual conference championships (128 total) through the Spring 2021 semester. 

With an athletics lineage that dates back to 1872, Stevens was one of five schools (along with Rutgers, Princeton, Columbia and Yale) invited to establish the original set of collegiate football rules in 1873. Stevens dropped football after the 1924 season.

Stevens offers 14 club sports including ice hockey, which plays at the Barnabas Health Hockey House in Newark, New Jersey—the practice facility of the New Jersey Devils and home of the Metropolitan Riveters.

Baseball and Softball 
Baseball at Stevens dates back to 1873, although the first recognized season was in 1906. Stevens has had two players drafted in Major League Baseball's First Year Player Draft. David Garcia was selected by the Minnesota Twins in 1973, and Charlie Ruegger was selected by the New York Yankees in 2018. 

Softball is Stevens' newest varsity sport. The team was established during the 2009-10 academic year.

Basketball 
Stevens men's basketball has won two NCAA Division III statistical championships, leading the country in field-goal percentage defense during the 2007-2008 season. Spencer Cook led the country in three-point field goal percentage in 2020.

Cross-Country and Track & Field 
Doctoral student Gina Dello Russo won the NCAA Division III title in the 400-meter dash at the 2021 Outdoor Track & Field National Championships in Greensboro, N.C. Dello Russo, a 2020 NCAA Woman of the Year Top 30 selection, was the first Stevens track & field champion since Amy Regan in 2017. Between cross country and indoor and outdoor track & field, Regan won six national championships for Stevens. She was the first cross-country runner in any NCAA division from New Jersey to win a national championship and later participated in the 2020 U.S. Olympic marathon team trials. Regan was also an NCAA Today Top 10 Award recipient. 

Alina Duran competed at the 2021 U.S. Olympic Trials in the hammer throw, reaching the final and finishing 12th in the country. 

Stevens has also won national championships in the high jump, with Gladys Njoku securing consecutive titles in 2015 and 2016.

Fencing 
Women's fencing was the first female varsity sport at Stevens, and its coach, Linda Vollkommer-Lynch, was the first tenured female faculty member and first female coach at the university. In 2018, Stevens' women's fencing team did not lose to a Division III opponent all season and finished with a 32-3 overall record. That year, they established a new school record for winning percentage at .914, the first team to achieve a percentage over .900.

In 2009-10, the men's fencing team was led by head coach Stephen Kovacs who, after being accused of two sexual assaults, died in prison in 2022. The team is currently led by former Olympian Jim Carpenter.

Lacrosse 
Stevens holds the distinction of having the oldest, continuously running lacrosse program in the United States. The program won a recognized national championship four times: 1892 and 1894 in the Intercollegiate Lacrosse Association, and in 1917 and 1918 in the United States Inter-Collegiate Lacrosse League. It has also won championships in the Skyline Conference, Empire 8 and MAC Freedom. 

Players to come through the program have achieved All-America and Academic All-American Conference awards and North-South All-Star Game Invitations. Some of them include: 

 Brian Lalli: All-America and Academic All-America midfielder (2004)
 Mark Beilicky: 3× All-American Midfielder (2005, 2006, 2007), 2007 pre-season midfielder of the year
 JR (Oreskovich) Maehler: 3× All-America attackman (2006, 2007, 2009), 2009 pre-season attackman of the year
 Shawn Coulter: USILA Short-Stick Defensive Midfielder of the Year, the first national individual award in program history.

Stevens hosted the 2006 NCAA Division III women's lacrosse national championship game.

Soccer
The 2008 men's soccer team reached the Division III NCAA championship game, losing to Messiah College (now University) on penalty kicks. They were the first Stevens team to compete in an NCAA national championship contest.

Soccer goalkeeper Zach Carr received All-American and Academic All-American honors in 2010. Carr led the nation in 2010 with a .927 save percentage and maintained a 3.92 grade-point average.  One of the best goalkeepers in NCAA history, he set the Division III record and tied for the most shutouts in NCAA history (55), played the third-most minutes in Division III history and posted the sixth-lowest goals-against average. Carr was also a recipient of an NCAA Top VIII Award.  

The women's team hosts an annual Engineering Cup and has one of the longest active consecutive postseason appearance streaks in Division III. The program was also the first in department history to receive an at-large bid to the NCAA Tournament and post an NCAA victory with a 1-0 win over Johns Hopkins on November 13, 2002.

Swimming
In 2011, Laura Barito, a two-time All-American in swimming and track and a two-time, two-sport NCAA national champion (in 50-yard freestyle swimming and the 400-meter hurdles), was awarded the NCAA Woman of the Year. Barito, who was also named by CoSIDA/Capital One to the Academic All-America First Team, was only the second Division III athlete to win the NCAA Woman of the Year Award in its 21-year history.

In 2012, Stevens swimmer Brittany Geyer won the national women's 200-yard breaststroke title.  Geyer came back in 2015 to win the national 100 breaststroke and 200 breaststroke titles, making her a three-time NCAA champion.

Stevens men's swimming has won 10 straight conference championships. Simas Jarasunas won the 100-yard backstroke in 2013 for the first national championship in program history.

Tennis 
Men's tennis is recognized as one of the top teams in the region. The Ducks have won 12 straight conference championships.

Volleyball
Both the varsity men's and women's volleyball programs were started by legendary head coach Patrick Dorywalski. Dorywalski coached 37 years at Stevens, including 31 with the men's volleyball program. His 635 victories are the most by any varsity coach at Stevens and were the fourth-most by any men's volleyball coach in NCAA at the time of his retirement in 2020. 

On April 26, 2015, Stevens won the NCAA Division III men's championship on its home court of Canavan Arena, the first NCAA team championship in Stevens' history.  

Women's team alumna Eva Kwan is tied for the most digs (62) in any single match in Division III history and the second-most in NCAA history.

Wrestling 
Brett Kaliner posted a 29-0 season and became the first national champion in program history in 2022, winning the title at 149 pounds.

Archived Varsity Sports

Football 
Stevens was one of the first five college football teams. In 1873, representatives of Princeton, Yale, Columbia, and Rutgers met in New York City to establish the first American intercollegiate rules for football on the model of the London Football Association. As the game developed in the United States, it became progressively more violent. The alumni magazine commented that the style of the game became too difficult and required an enormous amount of time and training, which could be afforded by larger colleges but would add too much work to the already difficult academic coursework at Stevens. Stevens holds a disputed victory over the University of Michigan.

Equestrian 
Kerri Rettig won an IHSA National Championship in Intermediate Flat in 2005. Stevens ceased fielding an equestrian team as of July 1, 2019.

Awards and recognition 
Stevens was named ECAC Institution of the Year in 2008 and again in 2013, an honor that measures a combination of athletics success and classroom academic performance at more than 300 Division I, II and III colleges and universities. Stevens is one of only three institutions to win the award multiple times. 

The athletic department's highest finish in the annual Division III Director's Cup is 13th, recorded in 2011 and 2016. The department has received an NADIIIAA Community Service Award eight times, most recently in 2022. Stevens has also won seven College Athletic Administrators of New Jersey (CAANJ) Cups as the Top Division III institution in New Jersey.

Facilities
Varsity teams compete in one of three facilities, two of which are on campus. The Schaefer Athletics and Recreation Center houses Canavan Arena, Walker Gymnasium, the DeBaun Aquatic Center, the Athletic Training Center, and the Wrestling Complex. The Schaefer Center construction was part of a $23 million investment in new facilities that also included renovations to Walker Gym and installation of a new turf field. 

Field sports (soccer, field hockey, baseball, lacrosse) compete at DeBaun Athletic Complex. Softball competes at Waterfront Park in Weehawken, N.J.

Student life

Greek organizations
Stevens Institute of Technology hosts chapters of 15 social and academic fraternities and sororities, many of which were founded on campus over a century ago. These groups, through their social, academic, leadership and alumni networking programs, are aimed at building lifelong connections among participants and to the institute. Indeed, they are successful at this aim, as evidenced by the fact that across the nation, "most of the donations made to [an] alma mater are given by members of Greek organizations." Popular hubs of social activity, in 2013, 25% of Stevens students were members of these organizations.

Members self-select prospective members, and chapters cooperate on a wide variety of inter-Greek programming to support campus life. Once a student becomes a member of one of the traditional social and academic societies they may not join another from that conference due to "anti-poaching" rules. However, members of the traditional social and academic fraternities, sororities and societies are often elected as members of professional, honor and/or service societies as they are chosen or earn the honor by grade, class rank or achievement. All but one of Stevens' Greek organizations are chapters of national fraternities or sororities, which in turn participate in several cooperative national associations, designated by one or more conference allegiances: the NIC (most social fraternities), the NPC (most social sororities), the NPHC (culturally African American), the NAPA (culturally Asian & Pacific Islander), the 'NALFO (culturally Latino/Latina), the NMGC (multicultural), the ACHS (most Honor Societies), or the PFA (Professional) associations.

Fraternities (men's)

  Delta Tau Delta, 1874, (NIC)
  Theta Xi, 1874, (NIC)
  Beta Theta Pi, 1879, (NIC)
   Alpha Tau Omega, 1881–1896 (NIC), dormant
  Chi Phi, 1883, (NIC)
   Sigma Chi, 1883–1891 (NIC), dormant
  Chi Psi, 1883, (NIC)
  Phi Sigma Kappa, 1899, (NIC)

  Sigma Nu, 1900, (NIC)
  Sigma Phi Epsilon, 1907, (NIC)
   Pi Lambda Phi, 1916–19xx (NIC), dormant
  Alpha Sigma Phi, 1926, (NIC)
  Kappa Sigma, 2012
  Lambda Upsilon Lambda, 1997, (NALFO)
  Nu Alpha Phi, 2008 (regional), Asian interest
  Alpha Phi Alpha, 2019, (NPHC)

Sororities (women's)
  Phi Sigma Sigma, 1982, (NPC)
  Delta Phi Epsilon, 1985, (NPC)
  Theta Phi Alpha, 2012, (NPC)
  Sigma Delta Tau, 2014, (NPC)
  Omega Phi Beta, 2016, (NALFO)
  Alpha Phi, 2017, (NPC)
  Sigma Psi Zeta, 2019, (NAPA)
  Lambda Tau Omega, 2020, (NMGC)

Professional, honor or service (usually co-ed)

  Tau Beta Pi, 1896, (PFA), honor society, Engineering
 Khoda, 1909, (Local) senior honor society, quasi-secret
 Gear & Triangle, 1919, (Local) honor society, Engineering & Leadership
  Alpha Phi Omega, 1949, service fraternity
  Sigma Xi, 1954, graduate science & engineering honors
   Psi Chi, 1972–20xx (ACHS), psychology honors, dormant
  Eta Kappa Nu, 1983, electrical engineering, computer engineering honors
  Alpha Epsilon Delta, 1992, (ACHS), honor society, Health

 Society for Collegiate Journalists, 1922, National Journalism Honor Society
 Order of Omega, 1999, honor society, Greek Leadership
  Chi Epsilon, 2000, (ACHS), honor society, Civil Engineering
  Upsilon Pi Epsilon, 2003, (ACHS), honor society, Computing & Information Disciplines
  Alpha Eta Mu Beta, 2012, honor society, Biomedical Engineering
 AAS Arnold Air Society, 19xx, Air Force cadet honors
  Phi Beta Lambda or FBLA, 20xx, professional, career development
  Theta Alpha Phi, 1960, National Theater Honors Fraternity
  Omega Chi Epsilon, 2016, honor society, Chemical Engineering

Among fraternities and sororities, inter-chapter cooperation is managed by two governing councils: the Interfraternity Council (IFC) and the Stevens Panhellenic Association (NPC groups). Professional and honor societies are faculty sponsored.

Notable faculty
 Carlos Alomar, professional guitarist, longtime collaborator with David Bowie, Artist in Residence and Director of the Sound Synthesis Research Center at Stevens
 Chris Gavina, professional basketball player
John Horgan, science journalist at Scientific American, author of the controversial book The End of Science (1996), director of the Center for Science Writings at Stevens
Jon Jaques, professional basketball player, assistant basketball coach (Cornell University)
 Victor B. Lawrence, inducted into the National Inventors Hall of Fame for his many contributions in digital signal processing in communications
 Deborah Sinnreich-Levi, professor of literature, specialist on Eustache Deschamps
Alex Wellerstein, historian of science, specialist on history of nuclear weapons
Jean Zu, mechanical engineer, dean of the Charles Schaefer School of Engineering & Science

Notable alumni

Charles Stewart Mott, M.E. 1882, co-founder of General Motors Corporation
Frederick Winslow Taylor, M.E. 1883, developer of scientific management methods and time-motion studies
Samuel P. Bush, 1884, steel and railroad executive, public servant, patriarch of Bush political family
Richard H. Rice, M.E. 1885; Hon. Ph.D. 1921, mechanical engineer and inventor
Harold Harrison, 1892, Minnesota state legislator and businessman
Walter Kidde, B.E. 1897, founder of Walter Kidde Constructors; oversaw the construction of Port Newark and Kearny, New Jersey's first traffic circle and the world's first cloverleaf interchange, the Pulaski Skyway; served as New Jersey State Highway Commissioner; founder of the Walter Kidde Company, maker of World War II safety equipment
Henry Gantt, M.S. 1902, developed the Gantt chart, an important project management tool
Alexander Calder, M.E. 1919, creator of the Mobile and popularizer of that art form
Louis A. Hazeltine, M.E., Sc. D., 1926, founder Hazeltine Corporation, inventor of the neutrodyne radio receiver
L. Sprague de Camp, M.S., 1933, science fiction author, Lest Darkness Fall, The Wheels of If, The Great Monkey Trial, winner of the Hugo Award (1997)
Alfred Fielding, 1939, co-inventor of Bubble Wrap
Igor Bensen, B.E. 1940, founder of Bensen Aircraft
Frederick Reines, M.E. 1939, M.S. 1943, discoverer of the neutrino, recipient of the 1995 Nobel Prize in Physics
Igor Ansoff, B.E. 1941, creator of the Ansoff Matrix, and founding dean of the Owen Graduate School of Management at Vanderbilt University in Nashville, Tennessee
Fred H. Colvin, M.E. Hon. 1944, journalist, author and editor in the fields of manufacturing, machine tools, etc.
Beatrice Hicks, M.S. 1949, founding president of the Society of Women Engineers and first woman engineer hired by Western Electric
Leon Febres Cordero, M.E. 1953, President of Ecuador, 1984–1988
Eugene McDermott, M.E. 1953, founder, Texas Instruments
Aaron Cohen, M.S. 1958, director of NASA, 1986–93.
Richard Reeves, M.E. 1960, Emmy Award winner, syndicated columnist, author, television commentator
Joseph Bushnell Ames, 1901, novelist
Richard Herman, B.S. 1963, chancellor of the University of Illinois at Urbana–Champaign
Lawrence Babbio, B.E. 1966, vice chairman and president of Verizon Communications, Domestic Telecom Group
Gerard Joseph Foschini, Ph.D. 1967, prominent telecommunications engineer who is in the top 0.5% of most widely cited authors
William W. Destler, B.S. 1968, former president of Rochester Institute of Technology
Jed Babbin, B.E. 1970, former United States Deputy Undersecretary of Defense, author of "Inside the Asylum"
Charles Petzold, B.S., M.S. 1975, author, The Annotated Turing: A Guided Tour Through Alan Turing's Historic Paper on Computability and the Turing Machine (2008), Code: The Hidden Language of Computer Hardware and Software (1999), and Programming Windows (1988–1998)
Mark Crispin, B.S. 1977, Inventor of IMAP
Greg Gianforte, B.E., M.S. 1983, founder of RightNow Technologies, former U.S. Representative for Montana, and 25th governor of Montana
Peter Ashmun Ames, 1911, MI5 operative
Gerald Goertzel, B.E., creator of the Goertzel algorithm
Peter Cooper Hewitt, electrical engineer and inventor of the Mercury arc rectifier
John White Howell, M.E., noted electrical engineer who furthered the development of the incandescent lamp, recipient of the 1924 Edison Medal, former president of the Edison Pioneers
Sandeep Mathrani, M.E. 1983, noted real-estate executive and current CEO of WeWork
James H. Mulligan Jr., M.S. 1945, former president of IEEE, secretary and executive officer of the National Academy of Engineering
John A. Nagy, M.M.S. 1979, author on espionage and mutinies of the American Revolution
Chadwell O'Connor, B.E., inventor of the fluid-damped camera head, variations of which are used in most tripods to film motion
Robert Crooks Stanley B.E. 1899, President and Chairman of the International Nickel Company, known for discovering the alloy Monel
Edwin Augustus Stevens Jr., son of the school's founder
Zehev Tadmor, Israeli chemical engineer and president of the Technion-Israel Institute of Technology
Charles Walton, M.E., inventor of RFID
Robert Weinberg, author whose work spans several genres including non-fiction, science fiction, horror, and comic books
Marques Brownlee, B.E. 2015, video producer, host, technology reviewer, Internet personality, and ultimate frisbee player on the New York Empire, best known for his technology-based YouTube channel, MKBHD who produces content under Top Gear and the Vox Media corporation
David J. Farber, B.E. 1956, currently a professor of Department of Engineering and Public Policy at Carnegie Mellon, inducted into the Pioneers Circle of the Internet Hall of Fame
John L. Hanigan, CEO of Genesco (1977-1981) and chairman (1977-1984)
Frank J. Effenberger, B.E. 1988, PON technology development and standardization; fellow of IEEE, OSA and Huawei
Jay Weinberg, B.S. 2014, musician and drummer for the heavy metal band Slipknot

See also
 Association of Independent Technological Universities
 Stevens SU-1, a glider design developed as a student project at the Stevens Institute in 1933
 Wunibald Kamm, professor
 Stevens Institute of Technology International, a defunct private university in the Dominican Republic

References

Further reading
 Clark, G.W. (2000). History of Stevens Institute of Technology, Jensen/Daniels.

External links

Stevens Institute of Technology official athletics website

 
Private universities and colleges in New Jersey
Universities and colleges in Hudson County, New Jersey
Sports in Hudson County, New Jersey
Buildings and structures in Hoboken, New Jersey
Educational institutions established in 1870
Hoboken, New Jersey
Engineering universities and colleges in New Jersey
Technological universities in the United States
1870 establishments in New Jersey